Natalie's Orchid Island Juice Company is an American fruit juice company based in Fort Pierce, Florida, that was founded in 1989.

Company history 
The company was founded in 1989 by Marygrace Sexton, whose husband was a 4th-generation Florida citrus grower based on the family land along the Indian River. Marygrace and her husband reformed the family's primarily packing-oriented operation to produce freshly-squeezed juice, and in November 1990 landed the new company's first distribution deal with Carnival Fruit of Miami. After a boom of rapid growth, Marygrace turned to her family (the Martinellis) for assistance, and they helped her turn her fledgling outfit into a major juice production facility based out of Fort Pierce, Florida.

Today, the company's products can be found in 30 states and 24 countries, and is a ten-time recipient of the America’s Best Tasting Fresh Florida Juice Award. The company is certified by the Women’s Business Enterprise National Council.

Products 
Natalie's offers the following juices and drinks:
Orange juice
Blood orange juice
Grapefruit juice
Honey tangerine juice
Tomato juice
Orange beet juice
Orange cranberry juice
Orange mango juice
Orange pineapple juice
Pumpkin Apple spice juice
Carrot tomato celery juice
Lemonade
Strawberry lemonade
Half and Half
Lemon juice
Lime juice
Margarita mix
Sweet and Sour Blend

References

External links 

 Official website

Juice brands
Companies based in Florida